Studio Sessions New York, 1968 is the ninth volume of The Private Collection a series documenting recordings made by American pianist, composer and bandleader Duke Ellington for his personal collection which was first released on the LMR label in 1987 and later on the Saja label.

Reception
The Allmusic review by Scott Yanow awarded the album 3 stars and stated "Even after 30 years of playing some of these standards, Ellington found new ways to re-arrange... Lots of surprises on this fine CD".

Track listing
:All compositions by Duke Ellington except as indicated
 "I Can't Get Started" (Vernon Duke, Ira Gershwin) - 4:27  
 "Waiting for You" - 4:10  
 "Knuf" - 2:32  
 "Gigl" - 5:01  
 "Meditation" - 2:34  
 "Sophisticated Lady" (Ellington, Irving Mills, Mitchell Parish) - 2:53  
 "Just Squeeze Me (But Please Don't Tease Me)" (Ellington, Lee Gaines) - 4:14  
 "Mood Indigo" (Barney Bigard, Ellington, Mills) - 4:43  
 "In a Sentimental Mood" (Ellington, Manny Kurtz, Mills) - 2:52  
 "I Let a Song Go Out of My Heart" (Ellington, Mills, Henry Nemo, John Redmond) - 4:02  
 "Don't Get Around Much Anymore" (Mercer Ellington) - 4:02  
 "Reva" - 4:14  
 "Ortseam" - 2:04  
 "Cool and Groovy" (Ellington, Cootie Williams)  2:29  
 "Elos" - 5:39  
 "C Jam Blues" (Bigard, Ellington) - 9:03
Recorded at National Recording Studio, New York on November 23, 1968 (track 1), November 29, 1968 (tracks 2-12), and December 3, 1968 (tracks 13-16).

Personnel
Duke Ellington – piano
Cat Anderson, Willie Cook, Money Johnson, Cootie Williams - trumpet (tracks 2-16)
Lawrence Brown, Buster Cooper - trombone (tracks 2-16) 
Chuck Connors - bass trombone (tracks 2-16)
Johnny Hodges - alto saxophone (tracks 2-16)
Russell Procope - alto saxophone, clarinet (tracks 2-16)
Harold Ashby - tenor saxophone, clarinet  
Paul Gonsalves - tenor saxophone (tracks 2-16)
Harry Carney - baritone saxophone (tracks 2-16)
Jeff Castleman - bass, electric bass on track 3
Rufus Jones  - drums

References

Saja Records albums
Duke Ellington albums
1987 albums